is a gusuku in the village of Kitanakagusuku, Okinawa, Japan. It is one of a number of castles built on the island of Okinawa by the Ryukyu Kingdom now in ruins.

History 
The legendary Ryukyuan commander, Gosamaru, built the fortress in the early 15th century to defend against attacks from the east by Lord Amawari of Katsuren Castle. Amawari attacked the castle in 1458 and defeated Gosamaru shortly before his own castle was attacked by Uni-Ufugusuku. The castle was visited by Commodore Matthew C. Perry in 1853, who noted that the walls seemed to be designed to absorb cannon fire. The six courtyards of this fortress with stacked stone walls make it a prime example of a gusuku.

Status 
The castle was added to the list of UNESCO World Heritage Sites in 2000. It is regarded as one of the 100 most famous castles in Japan.

Gallery

References

Literature

External links

Short history and directions to Nakagusuku Castle from Japan Guide
Nakagusuku Castle site run by Nakamura-ke, located near the gusuku.
The Amawari-Gosamaru dramatic episode

Buildings and structures completed in 1440
15th-century fortifications
World Heritage Sites in Japan
Castles in Okinawa Prefecture
Historic Sites of Japan
Former castles in Japan